The New Zealand College of Business (also known as NZCB) was  registered in New Zealand with the Ministry of Education in 2004 according to the 1989 “Education Act” (code: 1327).  NZCB is also recognized by the New Zealand Qualifications Authority (NZQA) as a tertiary level institute which provides and support to international students (Code: 7653). NZCB has three campuses, one campus is located in Auckland, and the other two campuses are located in Christchurch and Lincoln University.

NZCB has students from Asia and Oceania, a total of more than 60 regions. NZCB currently provides Business Administration Courses (from Level 4 to Level 7) and International ESOL Course to students. NZCB courses are designed to assist students to gain entry into a Bachelor of Business degree or Master of Business degree with cross credits available and find a successful future career in terms of employment and immigration.;

NZCB has formally established cooperation and academic relationships with University of Canterbury (UC), Lincoln University (LU), Christchurch Polytechnic Institute of Technology (CPIT) and Unitec Institute of Technology (UNITEC). NZCB also has formally established a cooperation relationship with various overseas universities, including the 0.5+1+2 Bachelor's Degree Program and the 3+1+1 Bachelor(Diploma) to master's degree Program.;

References

External links

College of Business